Young Peter Jackson (31 October 1877 – 14 September 1923) was a boxer active between 1895 and 1914. During his career, he was able to achieve victories over some of the most storied fighters of all-time, including Sam Langford, Barbados Joe Walcott, Philadelphia Jack O'Brien, and Mysterious Billy Smith. He also squared off against the legendary Jack Johnson in a bout for the latter's World "Colored" Heavyweight Title.

Born Sim Thompkins in Baltimore, Maryland,  he named himself after the great colored heavyweight bare-knuckle champ Peter Jackson when he became a practitioner of the sweet science. Known as "The Baltimore Demon", the 5'6" boxer fought at a weight of between 148 and 160 lbs. In his career, he racked up an official record of 78 wins (59 via knock out) against 24 losses (2 via knock out) and 28 draws. He also had a record of 5–10–2 in newspaper decisions.

Professional boxing record
All information in this section is derived from BoxRec, unless otherwise stated.

Official record

All newspaper decisions are officially regarded as "no decision" bouts and are not counted in the win/loss/draw column.

Unofficial record

Record with the inclusion of newspaper decisions in the win/loss/draw column.

References

External links 

Welterweight boxers
1877 births
1923 deaths
Boxers from Baltimore
American male boxers